Weightless is the second studio album by American instrumental progressive metal band Animals as Leaders. It was released on November 4, 2011 in Europe, November 7, 2011 in the UK, and November 8, 2011 in the US by Prosthetic Records. The album charted at No. 92 on Billboard’s Top 200 Chart, as well as No. 7 on Billboard’s Hard Rock Albums Chart, No. 16 on their Top Independent Album Chart and No. 50 on the Top Current Digital Album Chart.

Unlike the previous Animals as Leaders album, Weightless features a trio line-up instead of just consisting of Tosin Abasi along with featuring real drums in addition to programmed drums. Both guitarists in the group (Abasi and Javier Reyes) play 8-stringed guitars on this release.

The track titles of the album are chapter titles from the Rama series written by Arthur C. Clarke.

Track listing

All tracks written by Animals as Leaders.

Personnel
Animals as Leaders
 Tosin Abasi – guitar, bass
 Javier Reyes – guitar
 Navene Koperweis – drums, programming

Production
 Navene Koperweis – engineering
 Javier Reyes – mixing
 Dustin Miller – mastering
 Jay Wynne – artwork, design

References

2011 albums
Prosthetic Records albums
Animals as Leaders albums